is a Japanese musician and singer-songwriter. He is best known as lead vocalist and rhythm guitarist of the rock band The Yellow Monkey. When they went on hiatus in 2001, before officially disbanding three years later, Yoshii started a solo career in 2003 under the name Yoshii Lovinson. He switched back to his old name in 2006 and The Yellow Monkey reformed in 2016.

Career
Yoshii's first band was Urgh Police, which he joined in 1986 as bass guitarist under the stage name "Robin". After releasing a demo, an EP and one album, they disbanded. In 1988, Yoshii switched to guitar and formed a new group that included Youichi Hirose and Eiji Kikuchi, where he used the nickname "Lovin". When their vocalist left, Yoshii took over that position and recruited Eiji's brother Hideaki as guitarist. The Yellow Monkey had what is regarded as their first concert on December 28, 1989 at Shibuya La Mama.

The Yellow Monkey went on to have three consecutive number one albums and 17 top ten singles. With 10 million records sold, including 6.2 million singles, they were ranked number 81 on HMV Japan's list of the 100 most important Japanese pop acts. The Yellow Monkey went on an indefinite hiatus in January 2001, before officially announcing their disbandment on July 7, 2004.

Yoshii made his solo debut under the name "Yoshii Lovinson" in 2003 with the single "Tali". He took the stage name from Mark Levinson Audio Systems.

He dropped the Yoshii Lovinson name in 2006 and began using his old name with the single "Beautiful". His album 39108 was released on October 4, with the title derived from his age of 39 years old at the time and his October 8 birthday.

Yoshii released his first live album Dragon Head Miracle on April 30, 2008. His January 2009 single "Biru Mania" included a cover of "Kuchibiru Motion", which Yoshii wrote for the duo PUFFY two years earlier. The single was followed by his fifth album Volt on March 18.

The single "Love & Peace" was released on February 16, 2011 and a cover of "Betsujin" was contributed to the Reichi Nakaido tribute album OK!!! C'mon Chabo!!! which was released days later. His sixth album The Apples was released on April 13, 2011 and followed by his first mini album After the Apples just seven months later.

He covered the song "Razor Sharp・Kireru Yatsu" for the 2012 Kiyoshiro Imawano tribute album King of Songwriter ~Songs of Kiyoshiro Covers~. His 2012 single "Tenbyō no Shikumi" was used as the theme song of the film Key of Life.

In 2014, it was announced that Yoshii would transfer record labels to Triad/Nippon Columbia. He contributed a cover of "Be My Last" for the Hikaru Utada tribute album Utada Hikaru no Uta at the end of the year. The January 2015 single "Clear" was his first official release on Triad, which was the debut label of The Yellow Monkey, although his first cover album Yoshii Funk Jr. ~Korega Genten!!~ was released by Nippon Columbia two months earlier.

His song "Chōzetsu☆Dynamic!", which he composed with lyrics by Yukinojo Mori, is the opening theme song of the Dragon Ball Super anime. It was released as a single on October 7, 2015, with a B-side cover of "Romantic Ageru yo" that features his former Yellow Monkey bandmate Hideaki Kikuchi on guitar. The Yellow Monkey reunited in 2016 and began an arena tour in May.

In 2021, Yoshii formed the record label Utanova Music and signed a partnership deal with A-Sketch.

Personal life
Kazuya Yoshii married his first wife in 1992 at the first time as the yellow monkey debut. They had three daughters and one son before getting divorced in 2008. On June 26, 2015, it was announced that Yoshii married tarento Kaori Manabe who was pregnant with his child and due to give birth in the fall. Their marriage certificate was submitted in September and Kaori gave birth on October 20, 2015. He first met Manabe, who is fourteen years his junior and has been a fan of Yellow Monkey since middle school, in autumn 2011.

Discography

Albums
 At the Black Hole (February 11, 2004), Oricon Albums Chart Peak Position: No. 3
 White Room (March 9, 2005) No. 4
 39108 (October 4, 2006) No. 2
 Hummingbird in Forest of Space (September 5, 2007) No. 8
 Volt (March 18, 2009) No. 7
 The Apples (April 13, 2011) No. 1
 After the Apples (November 16, 2011, mini album) No. 3
 Starlight (March 18, 2015) No. 2

Singles
 "Tali" (October 1, 2003), Oricon Singles Chart Peak Position: No. 2
 "Sweet Candy Rain" (January 9, 2004) No. 2
  No. 8
 "Call Me" (January 13, 2005) No. 2
 "Beautiful" (January 25, 2006) No. 9
 "Winner" (May 23, 2007) No. 5
 "Shine and Eternity" (July 25, 2007) No. 6
  No. 9
  No. 4
  No. 4
 "Love & Peace" (February 16, 2011) No. 5
  No. 15
  No. 6
  No. 13

Other albums
 Dragon Head Miracle (April 30, 2008, live album) No. 12
 At the Sweet Basil (December 18, 2013, live album) No. 9
 18 (January 23, 2013, compilation album) No. 4
  No. 4
 SuperNoVacation (May 27, 2015, compilation album) No. 17
  No. 12

Other work
 All Apologies (2006): cover of "Polly" for the Nirvana tribute album
 PUFFY - "Oriental Diamond/Kuchibiru Motion" (2007): wrote and composed "Kuchibiru Motion"
 Unicorn Tribute (2007): cover of "Ataeru Otoko" for the Unicorn tribute album
 Love Love Love (2009): cover of "Help!" for The Beatles tribute album
 OK!!! C'mon Chabo!!! (2011): cover of "Betsujin"
 Tamio Okuda - "Kobushi wo Ten ni Tsukiagero" (2012): chorus
 King of Songwriter ~Songs of Kiyoshiro Covers~ (2012): cover of "Razor Sharp・Kireru Yatsu"
 Utada Hikaru no Uta (2014): cover of "Be My Last"
 T. Rex Tribute ~Sitting Next To You~ (2017): cover of "The Prettiest Star" for the T. Rex tribute album
 Tomoyasu Hotei - "Dangerous" (2020): featured on the song from the album Soul to Soul

With Urgh Police
 Demo (1985)
 Crazy Rock 'n' Roller (1986)
 Urgh (1987)

References

External links
 Official website

1966 births
Living people
Japanese male singer-songwriters
Japanese male rock singers
Japanese rock guitarists
Japanese record producers
Singers from Tokyo
Nippon Columbia artists
20th-century Japanese guitarists
21st-century Japanese guitarists
Japanese multi-instrumentalists
20th-century Japanese male singers
20th-century Japanese singers
21st-century Japanese male singers
21st-century Japanese singers